This is a list of Danish poets, including those who are Danish by nationality or who write in the Danish language (years link to the corresponding "[year] in poetry) article):

A
 Christen Lauridsen Aagaard (1616–1664)
 Emil Aarestrup (1800–1856)
 Werner Hans Frederik Abrahamson (1744–1812)
 Naja Marie Aidt (born 1963), poet and writer
 Arvid Andersen
 Benny Andersen (1929), songwriter, poet, author, composer, pianist; a member of the Danish Academy since 1972, and "probably Denmark's most popular poet", according to DR, the Danish public broadcasting organization.
 Hans Christian Andersen (1805–1875), poet and author
 Vita Andersen (1944–2021), writer and poet
 Kristian Arentzen (1823–1899)
 Anders Arrebo (1587–1637)

B
 Jens Baggesen (1764–1826)
 Solvej Balle (born 1962)
 Otto Benzon (1856–1927)
 Harald Bergstedt (1877–1965) writer, novelist, playwright and a poet
 Vilhelm Bergsøe (1835–1911)
 Kristen Bjørnkjær (born 1943)
 Thorkild Bjørnvig (1918–2004)
 Steen Steensen Blicher (1782–1848), author and poet
 Karen Blixen, who also wrote under the pen name Isak Dinesen (1885–1962)
 Thomas Boberg (born 1960)
 Anders Bording (1619–1677), poet and journalist
 Poul Borum (1934–1996)
 Anne-Louise Bosmans (born 1978)
 Jørgen Gustava Brandt (1929–2006)
 Per Aage Brandt (born 1944)
 Rudolf Broby-Johansen, also known as "R. Broby-Johansen" (1900–1987)
 Hans Adolph Brorson (1694–1764), bishop and hymn writer
 Friederike Brun (1765–1835)
 Malthe Conrad Bruun (1755–1826), Danish-French geographer,  journalist and poet
 Suzanne Brøgger (born 1944)
 Julia Butschkow (born 1978), writer, playwright and poet
 Ludvig Bødtcher (1793–1874)
 Emil Bønnelycke (1893–1953)

C
 Inger Christensen (1935–2009), poet, novelist and essayist
 Sophus Claussen (1865–1931), poet and writer
 Paul la Cour (1902–1956)

D
 Erik Bøgh (1822)–1899), poet and composer
 Tove Ditlevsen (1917–1976)
 Poul Dons, also known as "Povel Dons" (1783–1843)
 Christian Dorph
 Holger Drachmann (1846–1908), poet and playwright
 Ove Christian Drejer (1806–1836)

E
 Dorthem Engelbretsdatter, also known as Dorthem Engebretsdatter (1634–1716)
 Inge Eriksen (born 1935)]
 Jesper Ewald (1893–1969), author, journalist, translator and poet
 Johannes Ewald (1743–1781), playwright and poet

F
 Peter Faber (1810-1877)
 Christian Falster (1690–1752), poet and philologist
 Jens Fink-Jensen (born 1956), poet, author, photographer, composer and architect

G
 Duna Ghali (born 1963)
 Otto Gelsted (1888–1968)
 Christian Graugaard (born 1967)
 Simon Grotrian (born 1961)
 N. F. S. Grundtvig (1783–1872),  teacher, writer, poet, philosopher, historian, pastor and politician

H
 Henriette Hanck (1807-1846)
 Carsten Hauch (1790–1872)
 Henrik Have (born 1946)
 Johan Ludvig Heiberg (1791–1860)
 Peter Andreas Heiberg (1758–1841), author, philologist and poet
 Piet Hein (1905–1996), poet and scientist
 Johannes Helms (1828–1895), writer, poet and schoolmaster
 Henrik Hertz (1797–1870)
 Ludvig Holberg (1684–1754), Norwegian-born poet, writer, essayist, philosopher, historian and playwright who spent most of his adult life in Denmark
 Jens Christian Hostrup
 Per Højholt (1928–2004)
 Lone Hørslev (born 1974)

I
 Bernhard Severin Ingemann (1789-1862)

J
 F.P. Jac (1955–2008)
 Bo Green Jensen (born 1955)
 Johannes V. Jensen (1873–1950)
 Pia Juul (born 1962)
 Frank Jæger (1926–1977)
 Johannes Jørgensen

K
 Steen Kaalo (born 1945)
 Thomas Kingo (1634–1703), bishop, poet and hymn-writer
 Erik Knudsen (poet) (born 1922)
 Tom Kristensen (1893–1974)

L
 Thor Lange
 Marianne Larsen (born 1951)
 Niels Lyngsø (born 1968)

M
 Ivan Malinovski (born 1926)
 Sophus Michaëlis
 Christian Molbech (1783–1857), historian, literary critic, writer and poet
 Gustaf Munch-Petersen (1912–1938)
 Arvid Müller
 Poul Martin Møller

N
 Jørgen Nash
 Hendrik Nordbrandt (born 1945)

O
 Adam Gottlob Oehlenschläger (1779–1850), poet and playwright who introduced Romanticism into Danish literature
 Jess Ørnsbo (born 1932)

P
 Frederik Paludan-Müller (1809–1876)
 Nis Petersen (1897–1943)
 Erik Pontoppidan
 Christen Henriksen Pram

R
 Knud Lyne Rahbek (1760–1830), literary historian, critic, writer, poet and magazine editor
 Gorm Henrik Rasmussen (born 1955), writer of poetry, children's books, novels and biographies
 Halfdan Rasmussen (1915–2002), writer of prose for adults and poetry for children
 Christian Richardt (1831–1892), writer, lyricist and poet
 Klaus Rifbjerg (born 1941)
 Helge Rode (1870–1937), writer and poet
 Valdemar Rørdam, novelist and poet

S
 Ole Sarvig (1921–1981)
 Jens August Schade (1903–1978)
 Sophus Schandorph (1836-1901)
 Palle Sigsgaard (born 1976)
 Schack von Staffeldt (1769–1826)
 Michael Strunge (1958–1986)
 Ambrosius Stub (1705–1758)
 Morten Søndergaard
 Jørgen Sonne (born 1925)
 Knud Sørensen

T
 Pia Tafdrup (born 1952), novelist, poet, playwright and writer
 Peter Christensen Teilmann, (born 1962)
 Søren Ulrik Thomsen (born 1956)

W
 Johan Herman Wessel (1742–1785), Norwegian-Danish poet
 Anders Westenholz (born 1936), psychologist, writer and poet
 Christian Winther (1796–1876)
 Ole Wivel (born 1921)

See also

 Danish literature
 List of Danish authors

Notes

Danish
Danish
Poets